Prevarication is avoidance of the truth. Prevarication can include, or be part of:

 Deception
 Evasion (ethics)
 Waffle (speech)